= Jiangxi Business Post =

Chinese newspaper

- Founded: September 1, 1995
- Ceased publication: January 1, 2019
- Headquarters: Nanchang
- Website: www.jxsb.cn

The Jiangxi Business Post (Chinese: 江西商报), also known as Jiangxi Business News, was a Nanchang-based Chinese-language financial newspaper published in China. It was sponsored by Jiangxi Provincial Supply and Marketing Cooperative (江西省供销合作社) on September 1, 1995. The Post was a provincial-level newspaper.

Edited and published by Jiangxi Business Post Agency, Jiangxi Business Post unveiled the Business Weekly (商业周刊) in July 2005.

== History ==
In January 2005, Jiangxi Business Post was switched to a weekly publication. On January 1, 2019, the Post ceased publication.
